Lyonpo Jigme Zangpo is a Bhutanese politician who served as the Speaker of the National Assembly in Bhutan from 2013 to 2018.

References

Living people
Date of birth missing (living people)
Bhutanese MNAs 2013–2018
Speakers of the National Assembly (Bhutan)
Year of birth missing (living people)